Christopher Dale (born 16 April 1950) is an English former professional footballer who played as a winger in the Football League for York City, in non-League football for Scarborough and Bridlington Trinity.

References

1950 births
Living people
Footballers from York
English footballers
Association football wingers
York City F.C. players
Scarborough F.C. players
Bridlington Trinity F.C. players
English Football League players